Giffen is a surname. Notable people with the surname include:

Brad Giffen, Canadian television reporter, anchor and radio personality
George Giffen (1859–1927), Australian cricketer
James Giffen, American businessman
Keith Giffen (born 1952), American comic book illustrator and writer
Robert C. Giffen (1886-1962), United States Navy admiral
Robert Giffen (1837–1910), British statistician and economist
Walter Giffen (1861–1949), Australian cricketer

See also
Giffen good, in economics and consumer theory
Barony and Castle of Giffen
Giffen railway station, in Scotland

English-language surnames